Chromosome 4 open reading frame 51 (C4orf51) is a protein which in humans is encoded by the C4orf51 gene.

Gene 

The C4orf51 gene is located at 4q31.21 on the plus strand of chromosome 4. The gene spans 120,289 base pairs and contains 6 exons. The genomic neighborhood of C4orf51 includes LOC285422, LINC02491, NCOA4P3, and MMAA, all located upstream of C4orf51. ZNF827 and LOC105377468 are located downstream of C4orf51.

mRNA 
There are three known transcript variants for C4orf51, which encode for isoforms X1, X2, and X3. Though the variants vary in length, all contain exons 1 and 2. At times, C4orf51 is transcribed to form an mRNA corresponding to C4orf51 and the neighboring gene.

Protein 
C4orf51 encodes for a protein with 202 amino acids and a molecular weight of 23 kDa. The theoretical isoelectric point of C4orf51 is 8.6. Relative to other human proteins, C4orf51 has more serine resides and fewer valine residues.

Domains and motifs 
In humans, the C4orf51 protein contains one domain of unknown function, DUF4722. DUF4722 spans the first 168 amino acids of C4orf51 and has a predicted molecular weight of 19.3 kDa. In a compositional analysis of this domain, no extremes were identified. The DUF is highly conserved in orthologous proteins, particularly near the N-terminus.

Secondary structure 
Alpha-helices are predicted to span amino acids 20-34 and 150–165 in C4orf51. Amino acids 45 to 48 are predicted to form a beta sheet. No coils are predicted in C4orf51.

Tertiary and quaternary structure 
The best-aligned structural analog of C4orf51, generated by I-TASSER, contains Clr2_transil, a domain involved in transcriptional silencing. Per Origene, migration of a C4orf51 rabbit polyclonal antibody in gel resulted in a band at 23 kDa and at ~44-46 kDa, suggesting that C4of51 may form a dimer.

Post-translational modifications  

C4orf51 is predicted to undergo several post-translational modifications, including phosphorylation, glycation, and acetylation. Though SUMOylation and tyrosine sulfation are also predicted, the sites of these modifications are not conserved in distant C4orf51 orthologs.

Subcellular localization 
C4orf51 is predicted to be localized to the cell nucleus. The protein contains pat4, a motif commonly used to identify potential nuclear localization signals. This motif is conserved in the most distantly related C4orf51 ortholog known, found in Anolis carolinensis.

Expression 
C4orf51 expression is low in all tissues, with the exception of the testes. However, because C4orf51 contains long-terminal repeats (LTRs) of human endogenous retroviruses (HERVs) in the gene body, it has exhibited high levels of expression in differentiation-defective human induced pluripotent stem cells.

Promoter 
There are two promoter regions predicted by Genomatix, but only one (GXP_921944) is located upstream of the transcription start site. GXP_921944 spans 1910 base pairs on chromosome 4. There are 15 coding transcripts supporting this promoter, but none are experimentally verified.

Interacting proteins 
Experimentally-determined protein interactions for C4orf51 have not yet been identified.

Clinical significance 
Vlaikou et al. (2004) report that a 4q deletion containing C4orf51 and six other genes causes growth failure and developmental delay, minor craniofacial dysmorphism, digital anomalies, and cardiac and skeletal defects.

Homology

Paralogs 
No paralogs or paralogous domains exist for C4orf51.

Orthologs 
Orthologs of C4orf51 have been found in mammals and reptiles. Within class Mammalia, orthologs have been identified in orders Primata, Scandentia, Lagomorpha, Rodentia, Perissodactyla, Chiroptera, Carnivora, Cetartiodactyla, Sirenia, and Proboscidea, as well as mammalian infraclass Marsupialia. The green anole (Anolis carolinensis) and Burmese python (Python bivittatus) contain the most distantly related orthologs of C4orf51. Both species diverged from humans an estimated 312 million years ago. C4orf51 orthologs have not yet been identified in bacteria, archaea, protists, plants, fungi, trichoplax, invertebrates, bony or cartilaginous fish, amphibians, or birds.

References